

This is a list of the Pennsylvania state historical markers in Erie County.

This is intended to be a complete list of the official state historical markers placed in Erie County, Pennsylvania by the Pennsylvania Historical and Museum Commission (PHMC). The locations of the historical markers, as well as the latitude and longitude coordinates as provided by the PHMC's database, are included below when available. There are 53 historical markers located in Erie County.

Historical markers

See also 

 List of Pennsylvania state historical markers
 National Register of Historic Places listings in Erie County, Pennsylvania

References

External links 
Pennsylvania Historical Marker Program
Pennsylvania Historical & Museum Commission

Pennsylvania state historical markers in Erie County
Erie County
Pennsylvania state historical markers in Erie County